Corsione is a comune (municipality) in the Province of Asti in the Italian region Piedmont, located about  east of Turin and about  northwest of Asti.

Corsione borders the following municipalities: Castell'Alfero, Cossombrato, Frinco, Tonco, and Villa San Secondo.

Demographic evolution

References

External links
 www.comune.corsione.at.it

Cities and towns in Piedmont